Marco Cecchinato (born 30 September 1992) is an Italian professional tennis player. He has a career-high ATP singles ranking of World No. 16 reached on 25 February 2019. On 29 April 2018, he won his first ATP World Tour title at the 2018 Hungarian Open, becoming the first Sicilian tennis player to win an ATP title. Cecchinato is a clay specialist and his best Grand Slam result is a semifinal at the 2018 French Open.

Career

2013–2017: ATP and Grand Slam debut
In May 2013, Cecchinato qualified for the main draw at the ATP tournament in Nice, losing to countryman and No. 6 seed, Fabio Fognini, in the first round.

In July 2014, Cecchinato qualified for Umag, where he played another countryman and No. 6 seed, Andreas Seppi, in the first round. Cecchinato lost the match in three sets.

Cecchinato then made his Grand Slam debut at the 2015 US Open.

On 20 July 2016, Cecchinato was suspended for 18 months (until January 2018) and fined €40,000 by the Italian tennis federation for illegal behavior including match fixing and match betting. The ban was overturned and declared a mistrial after the prosecutors took too long to complete the initial trial phase. Despite this, Cecchinato admitted to telling potential bettors of his poor physical state prior to a match.

Cecchinato reached his first ATP quarterfinal at the 2016 Romanian Open.

2018: First two ATP titles, French Open semifinal, Top 20

In March, he played and won a Challenger tournament in Santiago, defeating former top 5 player Tommy Robredo en route.

He won his first ATP title in Budapest after reaching the final as a lucky loser, having lost in the qualifying competition; he thus became the ninth player ever to win an ATP tournament as lucky loser.

At the 2018 French Open, the 72nd-ranked Cecchinato came from two sets down to win his first Grand Slam match against Marius Copil. In the second round, he defeated lucky loser Marco Trungelliti. In the third round, he came from a set down to topple 10th seed Pablo Carreño Busta. In the fourth round, he beat 8th seed Belgian David Goffin in four sets. He then upset former champion Novak Djokovic in four sets (with a 13–11 tiebreaker in the deciding set) to reach his first Grand Slam semifinal. His French Open run ended with a loss to Dominic Thiem. His semifinal finish moved him to 27th in the world and enabled him, for the first time in his career, to be seeded at a Grand Slam tournament at Wimbledon.
Despite his first Grand Slam seeding, he lost in the first round in four sets against the young Australian Alex de Minaur. 

Later in July, however, Cecchinato achieved his second career ATP title at the Croatia Open, defeating Guido Pella in the final. As a result, he attained a career-best ranking of 22nd in the world.

At the 2018 Shanghai Rolex Masters, the Italian defeated Gilles Simon and Chung Hyeon to reach the round of 16, where he fell to Novak Djokovic. As a result, he climbed to World No. 19 in the singles rankings on 15 October 2018.

2019: Third ATP title and career high singles ranking
Cecchinato started his 2019 season in Doha where he reached the semifinals. That was his career best performance in a non-clay ATP tournament.

At the Australian Open, he lost to Filip Krajinović in the first round despite leading by two sets and having a match point in the fourth set. That was his third straight first round loss at a grand slam event.

During the Latin American clay court swing, Cecchinato won his third career ATP title at the Argentina Open, defeating Diego Schwartzman in the finals. Cecchinato didn't drop a set in the entire tournament, and lost just three games in a one-sided final. As a result, he also attained his career-best ranking of World No. 16 on 25 February 2019.

2020–2021: Fourth and fifth ATP finals
In 2020 season, which was affected by COVID-19 pandemic, he managed to reach his fourth ATP final at the inaugural Forte Village Sardegna Open in October, where he lost in straight sets to Serbian Laslo Đere. 

In May 2021, he reached his fifth final at the 2021 Emilia-Romagna Open, losing to first time ATP winner Sebastian Korda.

2022: Out of top 200, Two Challenger titles, back to top 100

In May, he qualified and defeated former world No. 3 Dominic Thiem at the 2022 Geneva Open in the first round.

In July, at the 2022 Croatia Open Umag he reached the quarterfinals defeating Lorenzo Musetti before losing to Franco Agamenone.

He re-entered the top 100 at No. 98 on 17 October 2022 following two Challenger titles in October.

Performance timelines

Singles
Current after the 2022 Monte-Carlo Masters.

ATP career finals

Singles: 5 (3 titles, 2 runner-ups)

Records
 These records were attained in the Open Era of tennis.

ATP Challenger and ITF Futures finals

Singles: 23 (13–10)

Doubles: 9 (6–3)

Record against other players

Record against top 10 players
Cecchinato's match record against those who have been ranked in the top 10, with those who have been No. 1 in boldface

 Marcos Baghdatis 2–0
 Gilles Simon 2–0
 Stan Wawrinka 1–0
 Pablo Carreño Busta 1–1
 Novak Djokovic 1–1
 Richard Gasquet 1–1
 Fabio Fognini 1–2
 Diego Schwartzman 1–2
 David Goffin 1–3
 Tomáš Berdych 0–1
 Matteo Berrettini 0–1
 Mardy Fish 0–1
 Juan Mónaco 0–1
 Hubert Hurkacz 0–1
 Gaël Monfils 0–1
 Kei Nishikori 0–1
 Denis Shapovalov 0–1
 Dominic Thiem 0–1
 Roberto Bautista Agut 0–2
 Alexander Zverev 0–2
 Milos Raonic 0–4

*

Top-10 wins
He has a  record against players who were, at the time the match was played, ranked in the top 10.

*

See also
 Italian players best ranking
 Best result of an Italian tennis player in Grand Slam

References

External links 
 
 
 

Sportspeople from Palermo
Italian male tennis players
1992 births
Living people
Match fixers
Competitors at the 2013 Mediterranean Games
Match fixing in tennis
Mediterranean Games competitors for Italy